Stanisław Grzesiuk (6 May 1918, Małków, Łęczna County – 21 January 1963) was a Polish writer, poet, singer, and comedian. He is notable as one of the few public figures to use and promote the singing style and dialect of pre-war Warsaw after their near extinction in the aftermath of the 1944 Warsaw Uprising.

Life 

Stanisław Grzesiuk was born 6 May 1918 in Małków near Chełm. Early in his life his family moved to Warsaw's borough of Czerniaków, a distinct cultural area populated mostly by factory workers and other working poor. After graduating from a local trade school he started work as an electro-technician for various enterprises.

After the outbreak of World War II he was arrested by the Germans in 1940 and sent to Germany as a slave worker. However, on 4 April of that year he was sent to Dachau concentration camp following an attempted escape. He was later transferred to Gusen I (Mauthausen) and would spend almost five years there until the camp's liberation by the American army.

Liberated on 5 May 1945, he returned to Poland. Although he survived the Holocaust, his health never recovered and Grzesiuk suffered from serious tuberculosis, which eventually killed him.

After the war, Grzesiuk started documenting his pre-war and wartime experiences. In 1958 he debuted with Pięć lat kacetu (Five Years in Concentration Camps), a striking description of his stay in Nazi Germany during the war. The following year he published Boso, ale w ostrogach (Barefoot but with spurs), a description of the pre-war life of Czerniaków, one of the most colorful boroughs of Warsaw. After its publication he became known as the chronicler of life of pre-war Warsaw in numerous songs, including the street ballads for which he became best known. Grzesiuk gained wide popularity as a singer during this period and played a prominent role in various Warsaw traditional-song groups, as a songwriter, singer and banjo player.

In the 1960s he started his work on yet another novel, Na marginesie życia (On the Margin of Life), documenting his struggle against tuberculosis, as well as the Polish post-war welfare services. Stanisław Grzesiuk died 21 January 1963 in Warsaw. His last book was published posthumously the following year.

Sources 

 Stanisław Grzesiuk: Boso, ale w ostrogach, Na marginesie życia, Pięć lat kacetu

1918 births
1963 deaths
People from Łęczna County
Polish male writers
Polish songwriters
Polish atheists
Mauthausen concentration camp survivors
Dachau concentration camp survivors
20th-century Polish male singers
Polish World War II forced labourers
20th-century deaths from tuberculosis
Tuberculosis deaths in Poland